Walter Christie may refer to:

 Walter Christie (mayor) (1863–1941), founder, and mayor, of Bergenfield, New Jersey
 Walter Christie (physician) (born 1942), American physician and novelist
 Walter John Christie (1905–1986), British colonial civil servant
 J. Walter Christie (1865–1944), American engineer and inventor